Hinduism came to Mauritius  when Indians were brought as indentured labour to colonial French and later in much larger numbers to British plantations in Mauritius and neighboring islands of the Indian Ocean. The migrants came primarily from what are now the Indian states of Bihar, Uttar Pradesh, Madhya Pradesh, Jharkhand, Maharashtra, Tamil Nadu, Telangana and Andhra Pradesh.

Hinduism is the largest religion in Mauritius, with Hindus representing approximately 48.5% of the population in 2011. Mauritius is the only country in Africa where Hinduism is the most practiced religion and percentage wise ranks third in the world after Nepal and India.

Demographics

History
The European colonial powers banned slave capture and trading in the first half of the 19th century, with the British Empire banning it in the early decades. However, the demand kept rising for low cost, high intensity labor in colonial plantations of sugarcane, cotton, tobacco and other cash crops. The British Empire substituted the slave labor supplies from Africa with indentured labor supplies from India.

The indentured people brought from India included primarily Hindus, but also included Muslims and Christians. They were subject to indenture, a long-established form of contract which bound them to forced labour for a fixed term; apart from the fixed term of servitude, this resembled slavery. The first ships carrying indentured labourers from India left in 1836. Sugarcane, a crop that is native to India, does not grow in the cold latitudes such as those found in Europe, but grows in tropical latitudes, were grown in large colonial tropical plantations to meet the growing European and American demand. It is these sugarcane and other tropical cash crop plantations that brought the indentured Hindus and other migrants from India to Mauritius, and other island countries such as Fiji, Jamaica, Trinidad, Martinique, Suriname and others.

The Hindus, and non-Hindus, who accepted indentured labor contracts and were brought to Mauritius, faced difficult conditions in India. Poverty in colonial India, starvation, epidemics and severe periodic famines in British Raj were rampant during the colonial rule. Millions of Indians died from mass starvation during the 19th-century British India. The extreme circumstances broke families, villages and triggered migrations. By 1839, Mauritius already had 25,000 Indians working in slave-like conditions in its colonial plantations, but these were predominantly males since colonial labor laws prevented women and children from accompanying the males. In the 1840s a severe shortage of cheap labor in British plantation colonies led to systematic shipment of large number of indentured laborers to Mauritius, both men and women, particularly from the ports of Calcutta, Bombay and Madras. According to Michael Mann – a professor of Sociology, the Hindus and non-Hindus of India who arrived in Mauritius were a small percentage of the over 30 million indentured Indian workers shipped around the colonial world between the 18th and early 20th century (many of whom returned after serving for years as plantation labor).

By the time Mauritius gained independence from the British Empire, a majority of its population were from Indian heritage. According to Patrick Eisenlohr, about 70% of Mauritius' total population is of Indian origin. Those who identify themselves as Hindus constitute about 48% of the total population, or about 69% of those of Indian origin.

Language
The major languages spoken by Hindus in Mauritius, at home and in commerce, are Creole, Bhojpuri, Tamil and Hindi. The politically active Hindus, states Eisenholr, have attempted to preserve Hindi by calling it their "mother tongue" and "ancestral language", as well as an assurance against the colonial discrimination they faced, but most Hindus mainly use Creole in their daily lives – a syncretic language of Indians and Africans that has developed on the island.

The island nation carries many Bhojpuri-language television programs on Mauritius Broadcasting Corporation, the channel controlled by the Mauritius government. Hindus in Mauritius that widely use Bhojpuri include the rural south and north-central region near La Nicolière. These settlements are of Hindus primarily from Gangetic plains regions of Bihar and eastern Uttar Pradesh, and their language is a modified form – a koiné in linguistic studies – of the original Bhojpuri.

Social stratification
According to Oddvar Hollup and other scholars, Hindus that settled in Mauritius did not observe caste system and intercaste restrictions have been unimportant in Mauritius. Most scholars, states Hollup, observe that this may be because "the economic and political conditions in the host societies where indentured Indian laborers were introduced had conditions that were not conducive to the maintenance of caste", and that caste was not a principle of social organization as all Indian laborers (coolies) were "doing the same kind of work and sharing the same living conditions".

Major Hindu festivals

One of the biggest Hindu festivals on the island is Maha Shivaratri ("Great Night of Shiva"). During this annual Hindu celebration, which takes place in the months of February and March, four to nine days of ceremony and fasting lead up to an all-night vigil of Shiva worship.

Other important Hindu festivals in Mauritius include:

 Thaipusam, honoring Lord Murugan. It is particularly observed by Tamil Hindus.
 Ganesh Chaturthi, a festival occurring on a public holiday assigned to the extensive Marathi-speaking community, celebrates the birth of Ganesha.
 Durga Puja celebrated in honour of the titular goddess over nine days.
 Diwali, "the Festival of Lights," also known as Deepawali. This Hindu festival is a national public holiday in Mauritius. It is popular, cuts across ethnic barriers, with Mauritius Christians observing it as well.
 Ugadi/Gudi Padwa, Hindu New Year.
 Holi The Festival of Colors.
 Pongal/Makar Sankranti, a harvest festival.

Temples in Mauritius
The International Society for Krishna Consciousness maintains several temples in Mauritius.

See also

 Hinduism in Africa
 Religion in Mauritius
 Demographics of Mauritius
 Hindu eschatology

References

External links 

 

 
Religion in Mauritius